Beata Poźniak (born 30 April 1960) is a Polish-American actress, film director, poet, painter and an Earphones Award-winning narrator. She is also a human rights activist who introduced the first bill in the history of US Congress to officially recognize International Women's Day in the United States.

Pozniak won the prestigious Voice Arts Award in the "Outstanding Video Game Character - Best Performance" category for her role of Skarlet, the Blood Queen in Mortal Kombat 11 starring alongside Arnold Schwarzenegger and Sylvester Stallone.  In thirty years of Mortal Kombat’s franchise, Pozniak is the first and only actress that won in the Best Performance Category.

Early life 
Poźniak was born in Gdańsk, Poland. Her mother was born in Wilno, Lithuania and her father's family is from Ukraine. Her parents divorced when she was six years old and she grew up with a single mother in Soviet ruled Poland during the Cold War. She eventually passed her entrance exam to the National Film School in Łódź PWSFTViT with the highest score in the country, and received a Master's of Fine Arts degree with High Honors at age 22. Her stage debut was playing the role of Justine, symbol of justice, in a Mrożek play, Vatzlav, under the eyes of a government censor. Martial Law was imposed on December 13, 1981. After graduating, she moved to Warsaw where she was assisted in getting necessary documents by Father Jerzy Popiełuszko. In 1984, the priest was murdered because of his support for the Solidarity movement. A film of this incident, To Kill a Priest, was later made by Agnieszka Holland. After arriving in Warsaw she starred in a highly successful theater production of How the Other Half Loves by Alan Ayckbourn. It was during rehearsals for this production that Andrzej Wajda became a mentor to Beata and gave her invaluable guidance for her career. In 1985, before the collapse of the Berlin Wall, Beata immigrated to the United States. 

Her very first film role, while still in high school, was as an extra in the Academy Award winning film The Tin Drum which happened to be filming near her home. She later made many film appearances and worked as a fashion model and was the calendar girl for Poland's National Soccer team.

Career

Film and television work 
Poźniak was discovered by the U.S. audiences when Oliver Stone cast her in JFK as Marina Oswald. This memorable role in an Academy Award-nominated film was her U.S. feature debut and it led to her appearances in over 30 film and TV projects worldwide. After playing Earth Alliance President Susanna Luchenko in Babylon 5 and a fiery young revolutionary in George Lucas' The Young Indiana Jones Chronicles, as well as a sharp scientist Ludmilla in Dark Skies or Eva in Pensacola she becomes known for playing badass female characters. Other powerful roles have included Paramount's JAG where she appeared as an exotic Israeli spy, a double agent working for the Mossad and CIA. In the television series Melrose Place, she created a ground-breaking character, Dr. Katya Fielding, a "straight" woman and mother who decides to marry a gay man - the role that is still very much talked about, making Poźniak one of the show's most popular former cast members. Her other diverse roles include Masha in Mad About You, Raisa on The Drew Carey Show and Tambor, the Japanese nanny in Oliver Stone's Wild Palms miniseries. In the CBS movie of the week A Mother's Gift, she was seen as a character that aged thirty years, whereas in a World War II drama entitled Miriam she played a Catholic woman who risks her life to save a Jewish girl from the Nazis. She also stars as Laina in the interactive movie/video game Psychic Detective, premiered at Sundance Film Festival as the first video game in the New Media category. An experimental film "All These Voices" where she stars as Beata, a World War II Survivor wins a Student Academy Award.

Voiceover work 
Poźniak narrated the bestseller, The Winter Palace: A Novel of Catherine the Great, a 19-hour audiobook for Random House, where she made use of her European background in bringing to life the 78 characters and their colorful accents. After embodying one of the most intriguing women in history, she read another 19 hour story of the Empress of the Night: A Novel of Catherine the Great. This was followed by a teen romance/adventure/sci-fi thriller, "The Illuminae Files", by Amie Kaufman and Jay Kristoff, which won an Audie Award. After that, she co-narrated "The Tsar of Love and Techno" by Anthony Marra which was selected in the Top 5 Best Audiobooks of the year by The Washington Post. As a producer and narrator she takes on "Libretto for the Desert – Poetry Dedicated to the Victims of Genocide and War" a project that acknowledges the universality of loss, persecution, and intolerance. Poźniak received the 2019 Earphones Award for the best read audiobook Drive Your Plow Over the Bones of the Dead written by Nobel Prize Winner Olga Tokarczuk. In the video game world, she voiced Skarlet, the Blood Queen in Mortal Kombat 11. She also narrated documentaries such as, "The Officer's Wife" about the mass murder of Polish officers in the Katyn forest and co-narrated Freedom from Despair, a film about communism, which won several Awards and received an honorable mention in the US Congress. She narrated the 2020 novel Light in Hidden Places by Sharon Cameron, based on the true story of Stefania Podgorska a Polish Catholic teenager who hid 13 Jewish persons during World War 2,

Theatre and performance art 
Seeking a new voice for herself in a uniquely contemporary style that declares "anything is possible," she founded Theater Discordia. Creating performance-art pieces that have been part of the L.A. Theatre Festival, and the L.A. Poetry Festival, she directed and wrote "Poeticus Umbilicus", "Poetry Discordia", "Return of Umbilicus", "We & They" and "Changing Flags." Her Theater Discordia evolved, with the participation of Peter Sellars, into a celebrated venue for experimental theater works.

Visual Arts 
Poźniak is also a painter, and continues to work in film, often appearing in experimental and independent productions, several of which she has also directed. In her directorial debut, which was a short film, "Mnemosyne", she used several art pieces made by herself. Praised by F.X. Feeney LA Weekly: "the multitalented Pozniak rapidly intercuts news footage of violence with live models and her own sensual sculptures to express a fierce moral sense." Through her art, Poźniak often explores what it is to be a woman in today's world with recurring themes of women's rights, social justice and women's history. Her artworks combine the choreographic traditions of theater with symbolic and surreal imagery of painting and sculpture. In her early mask series, Poźniak connects an ancient and mythological theatrical device with the surrealism of Man Ray to produce a stunning range of fantastical masks made from feathers and other found objects. Her more recent paintings and sculptures explore the collision of ancient myths and the modern world. By combining imagery reminiscent of surrealist dreamscapes with found objects, these works challenge our notions of continuity between past and present. Poźniak says:
"Surrealism is a lens through which I view many of the events and circumstances occurring in the world today. Whether it is the horrors of war or inspirational insights found in ancient mythology, I am constantly exploring fantastical juxtapositions that express something about the experience of being a woman. That is why my paintings and sculptures are often surreal and full of symbolism. Feministic, poetical, and political."

Charity and causes 
Poźniak's art is often auctioned off for charity and support different causes including Children's Hospital and Looking Above & Beyond, an organization dedicated to creating awareness and the enrichment of children with special needs or Our House, an organization providing grief support services, education, resources, and hope. She also hosted Domestic Violence Prevention Awards, National Women's Political Caucus's - Women's Leadership Awards.

International Women's Day 
 
Beginning in the late 1980s, soon after her arrival in America, Poźniak began a campaign to get the US government to recognize International Women's Day. She was very successful, and on March 8, 1994, she accomplished the introduction of the first bill in the history of the U.S. Congress for national recognition of the holiday (H.J. Res. 316) designating March 8 as International Women's Day. She made the headlines of the Los Angeles Times, who hailed her as "Taking the Banner For Women Everywhere". Furthermore, Poźniak established an educational organization, Women's Day USA, which aims to raise public awareness of women's inspirational achievements all over the world. She also works on projects that help bring awareness to third world issues, with a special emphasis on the representation of women's voices and their untold stories.

She received official recognition from the Los Angeles City Council, which commended her for her efforts in establishing International Women's Day as a day to be celebrated in the United States and from Mayor Richard Riordan for her vision in creating International Women's Day, and from Mayor Tom Bradley for bringing the idea to Los Angeles. Poźniak has been acknowledged for her ability to work across both political parties in seeking greater recognition for women's rights. In 1995, at a public awards event, a women's rights attorney, Gloria Allred acknowledged Poźniak for her contributions to human rights and to women's history and also named Poźniak as being her personal hero.

In 1994, to commemorate the introduction of the bill recognizing International Women's Day, Poźniak created a painting "Mnemosyne - International Women's Day", the Mother of Memory, which celebrates the many contributions to human rights by women from all over the world. A symbol of International Women's Day, the work depicts a community of all races of the world in a female form. It evokes the achievements of women along their struggle for peace and equality in the face of discrimination and war.

Awards and honors 

 Recognized by Congresswoman Maxine Waters for "bringing International Women's Day to the forefront and for initiating an official bill and for making this day a larger part of our nation's support of women here and around the world".
 Recognized by Senator Dianne Feinstein for seeing that "International Women's Day would not go by unnoticed" in the United States (1993)
 Presented and acknowledged by Councilwoman Jackie Goldberg for Poźniak's commitment for International Women's Day and creating Women's Day USA (1998)
 Awarded with a star, a bronze handprint at Festiwal Gwiazd, Poland's "Hollywood Walk of Fame." Past honorees include: Volker Schlöndorff, Peter Greenaway, David Lynch, Faye Dunaway, Ian Gillan, Anna Paquin among others (2017)
 Recognized by the Mayors of Los Angeles: Tom Bradley (1993) and Richard Riordan (1997) for her "vision in creating International Women's Day" 
 Awarded a "Lifetime Achievement Award" - Presented by Osobowosci i Sukcesy Magazine (2018)
 Voice Arts Awards Nominee - "Outstanding Video Game Character - Best Voiceover" Category for Skarlet (voice) in Mortal Kombat 11 Warner Bros (2019)
 International Maria Konopnicka Prize – "For Outstanding Achievements in the Arts and for Championing Women's Rights Around the World". Presented at the GRAMMY LA Live (2019)
 The Ianicius Klemens Janicki Award – "For Artistic and Literary Achievements" (2019)
 Voice Arts Awards Nominee - "Outstanding Spoken Word or Storytelling - Best Performance" Category for "Libretto for the Desert: Poetry Dedicated to the Victims of Genocide and War" (2019)
 The Earphones Award Winner (2019) – for narrating Penguin Random House Drive Your Plow Over the Bones of the Dead, written by Nobel Prize winner, Olga Tokarczuk (2019)
 The Earphones Award Winner (2020) – for narrating "The Light in Hidden Places" audiobook for Scholastic (2020)
 Voice Arts Award nomination in the Outstanding Spoken Word or Storytelling - Best Performance Category - for "Tribute to Nobel Prize Winning Poet. Beata Pozniak at the HAMMER Museum Reads LIVE" (2020)
 Voice Arts Award nomination "Audiobook Narration – History – Best Voiceover" for The Light in Hidden Places by Sharon Cameron • Publisher: Scholastic Audio (2020).
 Voice Arts Award Winner, Outstanding Video Game Character, Best Voiceover Skarlet, Mortal Kombat 11 • Warner Bros. Games • NetherRealm Studio (2020)
 The Tadeusz Micinski Award "Feniks" for outstanding interpretation of poetry dedicated to victims of war. (2020)
 Poet of the Month - selected by Quarry Press
 The Modjeska Prize - For continuing the traditions and legacy of an extraordinary Polish immigrant who succeeded as a Shakespearean actress in the U.S. (2021)

Filmography

Video games

Audiobooks and spoken word

Further reading 
 "Before the Camera Rolled", a book about the craft of acting by Jason Norman. Poźniak is one of the studies for her portrayal of Marina Oswald in Oliver Stone's JFK,  
 "Die Nacht der Zeitlosen" by Patrick Roth. Poźniak appears in the title-story of a cycle of 5 tales as an actress at a Hollywood party who played Marina Oswald in Oliver Stone's JFK, 
 "Portraits: Polish Artists in America" by Czeslaw Czaplinski, Rosikon Press 
 "The Official Melrose Place Companion" by David Wild, HarperCollins Poźniak is one of the cast members, plays Dr. Katya Petrova Fielding.

References

External links 

Beata Poźniak. beata.com.
About Women's Day USA. womensday.org.
Noriyuki, Duane (8 March 1996). "Taking the Banner for Women Everywhere". Los Angeles Times.
Beata Poźniak. Huffington Post.
McCabe, Maureen (29 April 2014). Beata Poźniak: Empress of the AudioBook. The Hollywood Times.

1960 births
Polish film actresses
Polish stage actresses
Polish people of Lithuanian descent
Polish people of Ukrainian descent
Polish television actresses
Polish video game actresses
Polish voice actresses
American film actresses
American stage actresses
American television actresses
American people of Lithuanian descent
American people of Ukrainian descent
American video game actresses
American voice actresses
Polish emigrants to the United States
Actresses from Gdańsk
Living people
Łódź Film School alumni
20th-century American actresses
21st-century American actresses
20th-century Polish actresses
21st-century Polish actresses
People